Wilfredo Bustillo Castellanos (born 17 January 1958 in Comayagua) is a Honduran politician. He currently serves as deputy of the National Congress of Honduras representing the National Party of Honduras for Comayagua.

In March 2013 Bustillo was arrested in a confuse incident when he was tramitting his driver license.

References

1958 births
Living people
People from Comayagua
Deputies of the National Congress of Honduras
National Party of Honduras politicians